Aglaia samoensis is a species of tree in the family Meliaceae. It is found in American Samoa, New Guinea, Samoa, the Solomon Islands, Vanuatu, and Wallis and Futuna Islands.

References

samoensis
Trees of Papuasia
Flora of the Southwestern Pacific
Near threatened plants
Taxonomy articles created by Polbot
Plants described in 1854